Rosa 'Harison's Yellow', also known as R. × harisonii, the Oregon Trail Rose or the Yellow Rose of Texas, is a rose cultivar which originated as a chance hybrid in the early 19th century. It probably is a seedling of Rosa foetida and Rosa pimpinellifolia. The cultivar first bloomed at the suburban villa of George Folliott Harison, attorney, between 8th and 9th Avenues on 32nd Street, north of New York City. The site of Harison's villa is now just south of the present General Post Office. The nurseryman William Prince of Flushing, Long Island took cuttings and marketed the rose in 1830. 'Harison's Yellow' is naturalized at abandoned house sites through the west and is found as a feral rose along the Oregon Trail.

'Harison's Yellow' was planted by the Heritage Rose Foundation in the Spring of 2009 near the grave of George Folliott Harison. The planting is now a part of the Heritage Rose District of NYC.

They appear in clusters in an early spring flush, lasting for three to four weeks.

'Harison's Yellow' has prickles, small, greenish grey leaves with seven to nine leaflets, and develops many small, globular rose hips. The cultivar tolerates drought, shade and poorer soils, needs little care, and is very winter hardy – down to −35 °C (USDA zone 4). It can be planted solitary, in groups or as hedges.

References

Schaffert, Nancy. "My favorite plant: 'Harison's Yellow' rose," Flower & Garden Magazine,  March–April, 1997
Christopher, Thomas. In Search of Lost Roses 1983; paperback 2002

Harison's Yellow